Linda or Miss Linda George is the début album by English-born Australian soul-pop singer, Linda George, which was issued via Image Records in August 1974. It was produced by Canadian, Jack Richardson, at Armstrong Studios in Melbourne. The album peaked at No. 32 on the Kent Music Report Albums Chart. Linda provided a top 10 single, "Mama's Little Girl" (July) on the related Kent Music Report Singles Chart, and a second single, "Give It Love" (December).

Track listing

Image Records (ILP-741)
Hard to Be Friends (Larry Murray) – 3.10
Indian Summer (Edmund Villareal, Wanda Watkins) – 3.12
The Singer (Barry Mann, Cynthia Weil) – 4.21
Mama's Little Girl (Dennis Lambert, Brian Potter) – 3.44
You and Me Against the World (Paul Williams, Kenneth Ascher) – 3.46
How May Days (Stevie Wonder) – 3.47
Give It Love (Mann, Weil) – 3.16
Memphis Nights (Tim Martin, Walt Meskell) – 4.17
Love Me (Tom Baird, Nick Zesses, Dino Fekaris) – 3.19
Between Her Goodbye and My Hello (Jim Weatherly) – 3.11

Charts

Personnel 

Musicians
 Linda George – lead vocals
 Mike Burke – steel guitar
 Wendy, Beverly and Margaret Cook (of Marcie and the Cookies); Howard Gable; Terry Dean – backing vocals
 Geoff Cox – drums
 Peter Martin – guitars (electric, acoustic)
 Ian Mason – keyboards
 Barry "Big Goose" Sullivan – bass guitar

Recording details
 Producer – Jack Richardson for Nimbus Nine Productions at Armstrong Studios, Melbourne
 Audio engineer – Roger Savage at Armstrong Studios, Melbourne
 Arranger, conductor – Peter Martin

References 

1974 debut albums
Linda George (Australian singer) albums
Albums produced by Jack Richardson (record producer)